Darling is a surname that may refer to:

Politicians
 Alberta Darling, American politician
 Alistair Darling (born 1953), British politician and government minister
 Charles Henry Darling (1809–1870), British colonial governor
 Charles Darling, 1st Baron Darling (1849–1936), British lawyer, politician and judge
 James Andrew Darling (1891–1979), Saskatchewan, Canada, politician 1944–1960
 John Darling Sr. (1831–1905), South Australian merchant and politician
 John Darling Jr. (1852–1914), South Australian businessman and politician
 John P. Darling (1815–1882), New York politician
 Lucius B. Darling (1827–1896), American fertilizer magnate and Lieutenant governor of Rhode Island 1885–1887
 Ralph Darling (1772–1858), British Army officer, governor of New South Wales, Australia
 William Darling (politician) (1885–1962), British politician and businessman

Sports
 Boob Darling, National Football League player
 Chuck Darling (1930–2021), American basketball player
 Gary Darling, Major League Baseball umpire
 Hannah Darling (golfer) (born 2003), Scottish golfer
 Helen Darling, American basketball player
 Joe Darling, Australian cricket captain, 1899–1905
 Lon Darling, founder of the United States' National Basketball League
 Malcolm Darling (born 1947), Scottish footballer
 Nate Darling (born 1998), Canadian basketball player
 Randy Darling (born 1957), American curler
 Ron Darling, Major League Baseball player

Entertainment
 Bobby Darling, Indian actress
 David Darling (musician), American cellist and composer
 Erik Darling (1933–2008), American songwriter and folk music artist
 Helen Darling (singer), American country music singer/songwriter
 Ida Darling (1875–1936), American actress
 Jean Darling (1922–2015), American child actress
 Jennifer Darling, American actress
 Maria Darling, British actress
 Sarah Darling, American country music singer and songwriter

Other professions 
 Brian Darling (born 1965), American lawyer and lobbyist
David J. Darling, British astronomer and writer
 Donald Allan Darling (1915–2014), American statistician
 Frank Darling (architect) (1850–1923), Canadian architect
Fred Darling (1884–1953), British racehorse trainer, son of Sam
 Gordon Darling (1921–2015), Australian businessman and philanthropist, husband of Marilyn Darling
 Grace Darling (1815–1842), British lighthouse keeper
 Jay Norwood Darling (1876–1962), known as Ding Darling, American cartoonist and conservationist
 John Darling Sr. (1831–1905), South Australian merchant and politician
 John Darling Jr. (1852–1914), South Australian businessman and politician
 Joseph Robinson Darling (1872–1957), special agent of the U.S. Department of Justice, author, promoter, explorer and soldier of fortune
 Sir Malcolm Lyall Darling (1880–1969), administrator in British India and authority on peasant agriculture
 Marilyn Darling (born 1943), Australian philanthropist and patron of the arts, wife of Gordon Darling
 Pamela Darling, American librarian and preservation specialist
 Paul Darling, English barrister
Sam Darling (1852–1921), British racehorse trainer
 Thomas Darling (1720–1789), Connecticut entrepreneur

Fiction
 Captain Kevin Darling, in the TV series Blackadder
 Cherry Darling, in the Planet Terror segment of Grindhouse, played by Rose McGowan
 Wendy Darling, principal character in J. M. Barrie's Peter Pan, and other members of the Darling family
 The Darlings of The Andy Griffith Show
 The Darlings of Clarissa Explains It All
 The Darlings of Dirty Sexy Money, headed by Patrick "Tripp" Darling III
 Jessica Darling series of novels by Megan McCafferty
 Darling, the owner of Lady in Lady and the Tramp
 Monica Costello aka Darling, a bank robber and the wife of fellow bank robber Buddy in Baby Driver portrayed by Eiza Gonzalez
 Sarah Darling (Scream), fictional actor in "Stab 3" played by Jenny McCarthy from Scream 3

See also
 Darling (disambiguation)
 Charles Darling (disambiguation)
 Elizabeth Darling (disambiguation)
 William Darling (disambiguation)
 Linda Darling-Hammond
 Darlington (disambiguation)